Ian Watson (born Teddington, Middlesex 1947) is a former English first-class cricketer who played county cricket for Hampshire, Middlesex (1969) and Northamptonshire.

External links
 Cricinfo
 Cricket Archive

1947 births
Living people
English cricketers
Hampshire cricketers
Middlesex cricketers
Northamptonshire cricketers
Date of birth missing (living people)